Acraea ntebiae is a butterfly in the family Nymphalidae. It is found in the Democratic Republic of the Congo, Uganda, Tanzania and Zambia.

Description
 
A. mairessei Auriv. Wings above fully scaled, black with 6 semitransparent white spots on the forewing (in 1 b, 2, 4-6 and in the apex of the cell) and a sulphur-yellow median band on the hindwing, formed as in melanoxantha Beneath the ground-colour of the hindwing and 8 or 9 elongate marginal spots on the forewing are bright sulphur-yellow; the veins of both wings very broadly edged with black at the distal margin; the streaks on the interneural folds are very short and thick, more like spots, and do not nearly reach the distal margin; cell of the hindwing only with one black dot. Congo and Uganda. - f. dewitzi Auriv. only differs in having the median band on the upperside of the hindwing red-yellow and the white spots in 
1 b and the cell of the fore wing smaller. Congo region: Kassai.

Subspecies
Acraea ntebiae ntebiae (central and northern Democratic Republic of the Congo, Uganda, north-western Tanzania)
Acraea ntebiae dewitzi Carcasson, 1981 (Democratic Republic of the Congo: south-east to Shaba, Zambia)
Acraea ntebiae kigoma Kielland, 1978 (Tanzania: Mount Mahale)

Biology
The habitat consists of forests.

Adults feed from flowers on trees and shrubs.

Taxonomy
It is a member of the Acraea circeis species group - but see also Pierre & Bernaud, 2014

References

External links

Images representing  Acraea ntebiae at Bold.

Butterflies described in 1897
ntebiae
Butterflies of Africa
Taxa named by Emily Mary Bowdler Sharpe